DO-160, Environmental Conditions and Test Procedures for Airborne Equipment is a standard for the environmental testing of avionics hardware. It is published by the Radio Technical Commission for Aeronautics (RTCA) and supersedes DO-138.

Outline of contents

Introduction
The DO-160 document was first published on February 28, 1975 to specify test conditions for the design of avionics electronic hardware in airborne systems. Since then the standard has undergone subsequent revisions up through Revision G.

Purpose
This document outlines a set of minimal standard environmental test conditions (categories) and corresponding test procedures for airborne equipment for the entire spectrum of aircraft from light general aviation aircraft and helicopters through the jumbo jets and supersonic transport categories of aircraft. The purpose of these tests is to provide a controlled (laboratory) means of assuring the performance characteristics of airborne equipment in environmental conditions similar of those which may be encountered in airborne operation of the equipment.
The standard environmental test conditions and test procedures contained within the standard, may be used in conjunction with applicable equipment performance standards, as a minimum specification under environmental conditions, which can ensure an adequate degree of confidence in performance during use aboard an air vehicle.
The Standard Includes Sections on:

The user of the standard must also decide interdependently of the standard, how much additional test margin to allow for uncertainty of test conditions and measurement in each test.

Version History
RTCA/DO-160, RTCA, INC., February 28, 1975
RTCA/DO-160 A, RTCA, INC., January 25, 1980
RTCA/DO-160 B, RTCA, INC., July 20, 1984
RTCA/DO-160 C, RTCA, INC., December 4, 1989
RTCA/DO-160 C, Change 1, RTCA, INC., September 27, 1990
RTCA/DO-160 C, Change 2, RTCA, INC., June 19, 1992
RTCA/DO-160 C, Change 3, RTCA, INC., May 13, 1993
RTCA/DO-160 D, RTCA, INC., July 29, 1997
RTCA/DO-160 D Change 1, RTCA, INC., December 14, 2000
RTCA/DO-160 D Change 2, RTCA, INC., June 12, 2001
RTCA/DO-160 D Change 3, RTCA, INC., December 5, 2002
RTCA/DO-160 E, RTCA, INC., December 9, 2004
RTCA/DO-160 F, RTCA, INC., December 6, 2007
RTCA/DO-160 G, RTCA, INC., December 8, 2010
RTCA/DO-160 G Change 1, RTCA, INC., December 16, 2014

Resources
FAR Part 23/25 §1301/§1309
FAR Part 27/29
AC 23/25.1309
RTCA DO-160

Bibliography
Aircraft Systems: Mechanical, Electrical and Avionics Subsystems Integration (Aerospace Series (PEP)) (Jun 3, 2008) by Ian Moir and Allan Seabridge
RTCA List of Available Documents, RTCA Inc., https://web.archive.org/web/20130512172348/http://www.rtca.org/Files/ListofAvailableDocsMarch2013.pdf (March 2013)
Avionics: Development and Implementation (Electrical Engineering Handbook) by Cary R. Spitzer (Hardcover - Dec 15, 2006)
Avionics Navigation Systems (April 1997) by Myron Kayton and Walter R. Fried
http://www.rvs.uni-bielefeld.de/publications/Incidents/DOCS/Research/Rvs/Article/EMI.html
The European Organization for Civil Aviation Equipment EUROCAE ED-14

Certification in Europe
Replace FAA with EASA, JAA or CAA
Replace FAR with JAR
Replace AC with AMJ

See also
Environmental Tests
Avionics
Hazard analysis
RTCA/DO-254 
ARP4761
ARP4754
HIRF
Reliability (semiconductor)
MIL-STD-810
RTCA/DO-178B

External links
 
 Video Tutorial by Aerospacepal.com

Electronic design
RTCA standards
Avionics
Environmental testing
Aviation standards